Sanglang is a small town located in Perlis, Malaysia.

Economy
The majority of the people in Sanglang work as farmers or fishermen. There is also growing number of "birds nests farmers".

Sanglang actually situated at the border between the states of Perlis and Kedah.

References

Towns in Perlis
Mukims of Perlis